Martinscroft is a tram stop for Phase 3b of the Manchester Metrolink. It opened on 3 November 2014 and is on the Airport Line on Hollyhedge Road next to St Martin's Church in Baguley, Wythenshawe.

Services
Trams run every 12 minutes north to Victoria and south to Manchester Airport. Between 03:00 and 06:00, a service operates Deansgate-Castlefield and Manchester Airport every 20 minutes. Services on the Airport line are operated by single two car M5000 LRV trams.

Ticket zones 
Since the ticket zone changes made by Transport for Greater Manchester in January 2019, Martinscroft is located in Zone 4 on the Metrolink fare zone scheme.

References

External links
 Metrolink stop information
 Martinscroft area map

Tram stops in Manchester
Railway stations in Great Britain opened in 2014
2014 establishments in England